The 2014 BYU Cougars women's volleyball team represented Brigham Young University in the 2014 NCAA Division I women's volleyball season. The Cougars, led by fourth year head coach Shawn Olmstead, played their home games at Smith Fieldhouse. The Cougars were members of the WCC and were picked to win the conference title in the preseason poll.

The Cougars won the WCC Championship in November and were awarded an NCAA Tournament berth. Despite being ranked in the Top 15 all season, BYU wasn't awarded one of the 16 NCAA Seeds for the NCAA Volleyball Tournament, forcing the Cougars to play on the road. BYU proceeded to win the Tucson Area, Seattle Regional, and became the first ever unseeded team to make it to the NCAA Volleyball Championship match. 6 different BYU players were awarded WCC honors, and 3 BYU players were awarded All-American honors. Shawn Olmstead was also named Coach of the year (see Season highlights).

The Cougars were swept by Penn State in the NCAA Championship match, giving the Nittany Lions their seventh national title, but the Cougars NCAA Tournament run gave the Cougars the #3 ranking at the end of the season.

Season highlights
The Cougars began the season by sweeping 9 straight sets to win the 2014 Blue & Gold Player's Challenge.
The Cougars were the last WCC team to lose a conference match.
BYU clinched a share of the WCC title with their victory over San Diego on Nov. 14.
BYU clinched the outright WCC title with their victory over Portland on Nov. 20.
Alexa Gray was named the WCC player of the year; Whitney Young was named WCC defensive player of the year; Shawn Olmstead was named Co-Coach of the Year; Gray, Young, and Jennifer Hamson won WCC First team honors; and Amy Boswell was named WCC honorable mention.
Boswell, Hamson, and Tia Withers Welling earned Academic All-WCC team first honors. Tambre Nobles and Young were named Honorable mention Academic All-WCC team members.
Jennifer Hamson was named the Seattle Region MVP.
Jennifer Hamson was made a first team All-American. Alexa Gray was named a second team All-American. Amy Boswell was named an Honorable mention All-American.
Shawn Olmstead was named AVCA Coach of the year.
BYU became the first unseeded team to make the NCAA Championship.

Roster

Schedule
BYU Radio simulcast all BYUtv games with the BYUtv feed. BYU Radio also carried the NCAA semifinals and finals with Dave Neeley providing the call.

 *-Indicates Conference Opponent
 y-Indicates NCAA Playoffs
 Times listed are Mountain Time Zone.

Announcers for televised games
@ West Virginia: No announcers (video only)
Washington: Spencer Linton, Kristen Kozlowski, & Andy Boyce
UMBC: Spencer Linton, Kristen Kozlowski, & Andy Boyce
Utah Valley: Robbie Bullough & Dave Neeley
@ UTEP: No announcers (video only)
@ New Mexico State: Adam Young & Kelli Alvord
@ Idaho State: Matt Steuart & Kade Vance
Utah: Spencer Linton, Amy Gant, & Andy Boyce
Gonzaga: Spencer Linton, Kristen Kozlowski, & Andy Boyce
Portland: Spencer Linton, Kristen Kozlowski, & Andy Boyce
@ Pepperdine: Kevin Barnett & Holly McPeak
San Francisco: Spencer Linton, Amy Gant & Andy Boyce
Santa Clara: Spencer Linton, Amy Gant, & Andy Boyce
@ Pacific: Don Gubbins
@ Saint Mary's: Anthony Schultz & Betsy Sedlak
@ San Diego: Chris Loucks
Loyola Marymount: Robbie Bullough & Dave Neeley
Pepperdine: Jarom Jordan, Kristen Kozlowski, & Andy Boyce
@ Santa Clara: No announcers (video only)
@ San Francisco: Pat Olson
Saint Mary's: Spencer Linton, Kristen Kozlowski, & Andy Boyce 
Pacific: Spencer Linton, Kristen Kozlowski, & Andy Boyce 
San Diego: Spencer Linton, Kristen Kozlowski, & Andy Boyce 
@ Portland: No announcers (video only)
@ Gonzaga: No announcers (video only)
@ Loyola Marymount: Steve Quis & Dustin Avol
vs. Seton Hall: No announcers (video only)
@ Arizona: No announcers (video only)
vs. Florida State: Sam Gore & Holly McPeak
vs. Nebraska: Sam Gore & Holly McPeak
vs. Texas: Beth Mowins, Karch Kiraly, & Holly Rowe
vs. Penn State: Beth Mowins, Karch Kiraly, & Holly Rowe

See also

References

BYU
BYU Cougars women's volleyball seasons
BYU women's volleyball